Don't Sleep may refer to:

 Don't Sleep (album), by Alice Ivy, 2020
 Don't Sleep (film), 2017
 Don't Sleep, a 2000 album by DJ Hurricane
 Don't Sleep, a 2010 album by Stealing O'Neal
 Don't Sleep, a band formed by Dave Smalley in 2018
 "Don't Sleep", a 2016 song by Dorian
 "Don't Sleep", a 2021 song by 24kGoldn

See also
 "Don't Sleep on Me", a 2017 song by Ty Dolla $ign featuring Future and 24hrs, from the album Beach House 3
 "Won't Sleep", a 2021 song by Tones and I